The NWA Western States Heavyweight Championship was a professional wrestling title in the National Wrestling Alliance's Amarillo, Texas territory, Western States Sports.

The title was in use from 1969, when it replaced Amarillo's version of the NWA North American Heavyweight Championship, through the promotion's 1981 closure.

The title was revived in 2015 by NWA Vendetta Pro Wrestling, with a new champion being crowned via a tournament held in Santa Maria, California. This was an eight-man, single-elimination tournament, won by "Loverboy" Matt Riviera. Though created as a "new" title, all previous champions have received recognition.

The original title was not related to the NWA Western States Heritage Championship, which was used in  Jim Crockett Promotions from 1987 to 1989, though the 2015 version does use the same title belt design, and as such, is often referred to as the Western States "Heritage" Championship.

Title retired once again as of September 8, 2017 when titleholder Rik Luxury defeated Vendetta Pro Wrestling Heavyweight Champion Apostle Judah Mathew to unify the two titles into the new Vendetta Pro Wrestling Western States Heavyweight Championship.

Title history
Silver areas in the history indicate periods of unknown lineage. An  indicates that a title changes occurred no later than the listed date.

2015 NWA Western States Championship Tournament

January 17, 2015 - Santa Maria, California

See also
List of National Wrestling Alliance championships
NWA North American Heavyweight Championship (Amarillo version)
NWA Western States Heritage Championship
NWA Western States Tag Team Championship

References

Heavyweight wrestling championships
National Wrestling Alliance championships
Regional professional wrestling championships
Western States Sports championships